Kublai Khan was a grandson of Genghis Khan, Khagan of the Mongol Empire and founder of the Yuan Dynasty.

Kublai, Kublai Khan or Kubla Khan may also refer to:

 Kublai Khan (band), an American hardcore/metalcore band
 "Kublai Khan" (song), a 2003 song by Jedi Mind Tricks
 Kublai Millan (born 1974), Filipino artist
 Kubla Khan, a poem by Samuel Taylor Coleridge

See also
 Khubilai Noyon (fl. 1211), Mongol commander; see 
 Kubilay, surname